Newton is a city in Middlesex County, Massachusetts, United States. Newton resembles a patchwork of thirteen villages, without a city center. At the 2020 U.S. census, the population of Newton was 88,923.

History

Newton was settled in 1630 as part of "the newe towne", which was renamed Cambridge in 1638. Roxbury minister John Eliot persuaded the Native American people of Nonantum, a sub-tribe of the Massachusett led by a sachem named Waban, to relocate to Natick in 1651, fearing that they would be exploited by colonists. Newton was incorporated as a separate town, known as Cambridge Village, on December 15, 1681, then renamed Newtown in 1691, and finally Newton in 1766. It became a city on January 5, 1874. Newton is known as The Garden City.

In Reflections in Bullough's Pond, Newton historian Diana Muir describes the early industries that developed in the late 18th and early 19th centuries in a series of mills built to take advantage of the water power available at Newton Upper Falls and Newton Lower Falls. Snuff, chocolate, glue, paper and other products were produced in these small mills but, according to Muir, the water power available in Newton was not sufficient to turn Newton into a manufacturing city, although it was, beginning in 1902, the home of the Stanley Motor Carriage Company, the maker of the Stanley Steamer.

Newton, according to Muir, became one of America's earliest commuter suburbs. The Boston and Worcester, one of America's earliest railroads, reached West Newton in 1834. Wealthy Bostonian businessmen took advantage of the new commuting opportunity offered by the railroad, building gracious homes on erstwhile farmland of West Newton hill and on Commonwealth street. Muir points out that these early commuters needed sufficient wealth to employ a groom and keep horses, to drive them from their hilltop homes to the station.

Further suburbanization came in waves. One wave began with the streetcar lines that made many parts of Newton accessible for commuters in the late nineteenth century. The next wave came in the 1920s when automobiles became affordable to a growing upper middle class. Even then, however, Oak Hill continued to be farmed, mostly market gardening, until the prosperity of the 1950s made all of Newton more densely settled.

Two of the 9/11 hijackers stayed in Newton the night before the attack. The hijackers of American Airlines Flight 11 spent their last night in Newton's Park Inn, an economy motel across the street from the Chestnut Hill Mall and within walking distance of The Atrium.

Each April on Patriots' Day, the Boston Marathon is run through the city, entering from Wellesley on Route 16 (Washington Street) where runners encounter the first of the four infamous Newton Hills. It then turns right onto Route 30 (Commonwealth Avenue) for the long haul into Boston. There are two more hills before reaching Centre Street, and then the fourth and most noted, Heartbreak Hill, rises shortly after Centre Street. Residents and visitors line the race route along Washington Street and Commonwealth Avenue to cheer the runners.

Geography 

It is also bordered by Waltham and Watertown on the north, Needham and the West Roxbury neighborhood of Boston on the south, Wellesley and Weston on the west, and Brookline and the Brighton neighborhood of Boston on the east.

The Charles River flows along the north and west parts of Newton, and Route 128 passes through the west part of the city.

The Massachusetts Turnpike goes through the more urbanized northern section of the city before heading into Boston. Additional major highways in Newton include Route 9, serving the southern parts of the city, and Hammond Pond Parkway, which is the main north–south route through Chestnut Hill and provides access to Brookline and West Roxbury.

Geological history

Geologically Newton located within topographic lowland the Boston Basin of the Appalachian Mountain chain.  This lowland is surrounded by a ring of highland drumlins which were left after the last glaciation twelve thousand years ago.   

There are several unique outcroppings of rocks around Newton where  geologic history revealing of how territory have formed and has changed over the past hundreds millions of years of drift supercontinents and ancient oceans,  earthquake activity associated with volcanism and related faulting activity and changing climate. There are mainly three types of bedrock: Roxbury Conglomerate, Cambridge Argillite or Slate, and Brighton Volcanics and the Mattapan Volcanics pre-Cambrian foundation of Dedham Granodiorite. The Boston Border Fault and the Shawmut anticline of Newton  formed as the alpine mountains of east-central Massachusetts were created.      Unique outcroppings rocks exposure has steadily declined as Newton area has become increasingly developed.

Topography

Newton has grown around a formation of seven hills. "The general features of Newton are not without interest. Seven principal elevations mark its surface, like the seven hills of ancient Rome, with the difference that the seven hills of Newton are much more distinct than the seven hills of Rome: Nonantum Hill, Waban Hill, Chestnut Hill, Bald Pate Hill, Oak Hill, Institution Hill and Mount Ida."

Villages

Rather than having a single city center, Newton is a patchwork of thirteen villages, many boasting small downtown areas of their own. The 13 villages are: Auburndale, Chestnut Hill, Newton Centre, Newton Corner, Newton Highlands, Newton Lower Falls, Newton Upper Falls (both on the Charles River, and both former small industrial sites), Newtonville, Nonantum (also known as Silver Lake or "The Lake"), Oak Hill, Thompsonville, Waban and West Newton. Oak Hill Park is a place within the village of Oak Hill that itself is shown as a separate and distinct village on some city maps (including a map dated 2010 on the official City of Newton website), and Four Corners is also shown as a village on some city maps. Although most of the villages have a post office, they have no legal definition and no firmly defined borders. This village-based system often causes some confusion with addresses and for first-time visitors.

Climate

Demographics

As of the census of 2010, there were 85,146 people, 32,648 households, and 20,499 families residing in the city. The racial makeup of the city was 79.6% White, 11.5% Asian, 2.5% African American, 0.07% Native American, 0.03% Pacific Islander, 0.71% from other races, and 1.46% from two or more races. Hispanic or Latino of any race were 4.1% of the population (0.7% Puerto Rican, 0.6% Mexican, 0.4% Colombian, 0.3% Guatemalan, 0.3% Argentine). (2010 Census Report: Census report Quickfacts.com)

Newton, along with neighboring Brookline, is known for its considerable Jewish and Asian populations. The Jewish population  was estimated as roughly 28,002.

There were 31,201 households, out of which 31.1% had children under the age of 18 living with them, 55.2% were married couples living together, 8.0% had a female householder with no husband present, and 34.3% were non-families. Of all households, 25.5% were made up of individuals, and 11.1% had someone living alone who was 65 years of age or older.  As of the 2008 US Census, the average household size was 2.60 and the average family size was 3.11.

In the city, the population was spread out, with 21.2% under the age of 18, 10.3% from 18 to 24, 28.2% from 25 to 44, 25.2% from 45 to 64, and 15.1% who were 65 years of age or older.  The median age was 39 years. For every 100 females, there were 86.8 males.  For every 100 females age 18 and over, there were 82.7 males.

The median income for a household in the city was $107,696, and the median income for a family was $136,843. Males had a median income of $95,387 versus $60,520 for females. The per capita income for the city was $56,163. About 3.6% of families and 5.9% of the population were below the poverty line, including 5.2% of those under age 18 and 9.4% of those age 65 or over.

As of 2015, 21.9% of the residents of Newton were born outside of the United States.

Economy
Newton's largest employers include Boston College and Newton-Wellesley Hospital. Companies based in Newton include TechTarget, CyberArk and Upromise. Until July 2015, Newton was also home to the global headquarters of TripAdvisor, the world's largest travel site, reaching nearly 280 million unique monthly visitors. TripAdvisor moved into a newly built headquarters in neighboring Needham.

Income

Data is from the 2009–2013 American Community Survey 5-Year Estimates.

Arts and culture
The city has two symphony orchestras, the New Philharmonia Orchestra of Massachusetts and the Newton Symphony Orchestra. The Joanne Langione Dance Center, an American youth dance school was founded in 1976.

Points of interest

 Crystal Lake is a  natural lake located in Newton Centre. Its shores, mostly lined with private homes, also host two small parks, a designated swimming area, and a bathhouse. The public is not allowed to swim outside of the small swimming area. Previously known as Wiswall's Pond, it became known as Crystal Lake sometime between 1855 and 1875. The name was given by a nineteenth-century commercial ice harvester that sold ice cut from the pond in winter.
 The Jackson Homestead, now the Newton History Museum at the Jackson Homestead, is best known for its history as a stop on the Underground Railroad. It was built in 1809 as a farmhouse designed in the Federal style, and is now a museum with paintings, costumes, photographs, manuscripts, maps and historical artifacts.
 Heartbreak Hill, notably challenging stretch of the Boston Marathon, on Commonwealth Avenue between Centre Street and Boston College.
 Newton is home to many exclusive golf courses such as Woodland Country Club, Charles River Country Club, and Brae Burn Country Club, which held the United States Open in 1919.
 City Stable and Garage, historic building
 The John A. Fenno House is a historic house at 171 Lowell Avenue, built , and a rare local example of Gothic Revival styling.
 The House at 173–175 Ward Street is one of the city's few Federal style houses, built 
 Echo Bridge is a notable 19th-century masonry arch bridge with views of the river and Hemlock Gorge in Hemlock Gorge Reservation just off Route 9 in Newton Upper Falls.
 Norumbega Park was located in Auburndale on the Charles River. Opening in 1897 as a trolley park, it was a popular amusement park through the 1950s before closing in 1963. Its Totem Pole Ballroom became a well-known dancing and entertainment venue for big bands touring during the 1940s. The park is now a popular dog-walking site with hills, meadows, woods, and access to the river.

 Auburndale Cove is a multipurpose picnic and recreational area on the Charles River just down the walking path from Norumbega Park.
 Chestnut Hill Reservoir is a very popular park with residents of Newton, Brookline, and the Brighton section of Boston. Although completely within the Boston city limits, it is directly contiguous to the Newton city limits. Designed by Frederick Law Olmsted, the designer of Central Park in New York City and the Emerald Necklace in Boston, the park offers beautiful views of the Boston skyline, and is framed by stately homes and the campus of Boston College. Although not generally used to supply water to Boston, the reservoir was temporarily brought back online on May 1, 2010, during a failure of a connecting pipe at the end of the MetroWest Water Supply Tunnel.
 Bullough's Pond is an old mill pond transformed into a landscape feature when Newton became a suburban community in the late nineteenth century. It has been the subject of two books, Reflections in Bullough's Pond: Economy and Ecosystem in New England, by Diana Muir, and Once Around Bullough's Pond: A Native American Epic, by Douglas Worth. It was long maintained by the city as an ice skating venue, but skating is no longer allowed. A scene from the 2008 remake of The Women was filmed there.
 The city of Newton has designated several roads in the city as "scenic". Along with this designation come regulations aimed at curbing tree removal and trimming along the roads, as well as stemming the removal of historic stone walls. The city designated the following as scenic roads: Hobart Rd., Waban Ave., Sumner St., Chestnut St., Concord St., Dudley Rd., Fuller St., Hammond St., Valentine St., Lake Ave., Highland St., and Brookside Ave.
 The First Baptist Church in Newton Centre, constructed in 1888, was designed by John Lyman Faxon in the Richardsonian Romanesque style pioneered by architect Henry Hobson Richardson.
 The WHDH-TV tower is one of the tallest free-standing lattice towers in the United States.

Government

City
Newton has an elected strong mayor-council form of government. The council is called the City Council. The mayor is Ruthanne Fuller.  Fuller is the first woman to be elected Mayor of Newton.

The elected officials are:
Mayor: Ruthanne Fuller, the city's chief executive officer and appoints the Chief Administrative Officer.
The City Council, Newton's legislative branch of municipal government, is made up of 24 members – sixteen Councilors-at-large and eight Ward Councilors.  Councilors are elected every two years.

As of October 2021, the makeup of the City Council is:

Newton's school committee decides policies and budget for Newton Public Schools. It has nine voting members, consisting of the Mayor of Newton and eight at-large Ward representatives, who are elected.

County
Mismanagement of Middlesex County's public hospital in the mid-1990s left the county on the brink of insolvency, and in 1997 the Massachusetts legislature stepped in by assuming all assets and obligations of the county. The government of Middlesex County was officially abolished on July 11, 1997. The sheriff and some other regional officials with specific duties are still elected locally to perform duties within the county region, but there is no county council or commission. However, communities are now granted the right to form their own regional compacts for sharing services.

These are the remaining elected officers for Middlesex County:
Clerk of Courts: 	Michael A. Sullivan
County Treasurer: 	Position eliminated
District Attorney: 	Marian T. Ryan
Register of Deeds: 	Maria C. Curtatone
Register of Probate: 	Tara E. DeCristofaro
County Sheriff: Peter J. Koutoujian, Jr.

State
House of Representatives:
 John J. Lawn, Democrat of Watertown: Tenth Middlesex District, includes Precincts 1 and 4 of Ward 1, Newton.
 Kay Khan, Democrat of Newton: Eleventh Middlesex District, includes precincts 2 and 3 of Ward 1, All precincts in Wards 2, 3 and 4 and precinct 2 of Ward 7, Newton.
 Ruth Balser Democrat of Newton: Twelfth Middlesex District, includes all precincts in Wards 5 and 6, precincts 1, 3 and 4 of Ward 7; and all precincts in Ward 8, Newton.
Senate:
 Cynthia Stone Creem, Democrat of Newton: 1st Middlesex District and Norfolk, since 1998.

Federal

Congress
 House of Representatives: Massachusetts's 4th congressional district: Jake Auchincloss, Democrat
 Senate: Ed Markey, Democrat
 Senate: Elizabeth Warren, Democrat

Education

Public schools

Public education is provided by Newton Public Schools.

Elementary

 Angier Elementary School
 Bowen Elementary School
 Burr Elementary School
 Cabot Elementary School
 Countryside Elementary School
 Franklin Elementary School
 Horace Mann Elementary School
 Lincoln Eliot Elementary School
 Mason Rice Elementary School
 Memorial Spaulding Elementary School
 Peirce Elementary School
 Underwood Elementary School
 Ward Elementary School
 Williams Elementary School
 Zervas Elementary School

Middle schools

 Bigelow Middle School
 Brown Middle School
 Oak Hill Middle School
 F.A. Day Middle School

High schools
Newton North High School
Newton South High School

Private schools

 Fessenden School is a K–9 day and 5–9 boarding school for boys.
 Jackson School is a private, Catholic elementary school sponsored by the Sisters of Saint Joseph of Boston.
 Newton Country Day School
 Solomon Schechter Day School of Greater Boston is a K–8 Conservative Jewish day school.
 Newton Montessori School is a K–6 private elementary school.
 Mount Alvernia High School is a private girls' school for grades 7–12.
 Mount Alvernia Academy is an independent Catholic School for preschool through grade 6.

Higher education
Colleges and universities located in Newton include:

 Boston College in Chestnut Hill
 Boston College Law School in Newton Centre
 Hebrew College in Newton Centre
 Lasell University in Auburndale
 Mount Ida Campus of UMass Amherst in Oak Hill, formerly Mount Ida College
 William James College in Oak Hill, formerly Massachusetts School of Professional Psychology

Former colleges

Newton Junior College
Newton Junior College, operated by the Newton Public Schools, opened in 1946 to serve the needs of returning veterans who otherwise would not have been able to continue their education due to the overcrowding of colleges and universities at that time. It used the facilities of Newton High School (now Newton North High School) until its own adjacent campus was built. It closed in 1976 due to declining enrollment and increased costs. The availability of such places as UMass Boston contributed to its demise. According to the city, its former campus is now "Claflin Park," a 25-unit multi-family development.

Others
Other former colleges include Aquinas College (1961–1999), Mount Alvernia College (1959–1973), Mount Ida College (1899–2018), and Newton College of the Sacred Heart (1946–1975). Andover Newton Theological School relocated to New Haven, CT (1807–2017).

Media

News
The city's community newspapers are The Newton TAB, a weekly print paper published by the Community Newspaper Company, and owned by Gatehouse Media. The Newton Patch covers daily local news out of Newton and offers a platform for locals to post opinion, events, news tips and blogs on the community online platform as well. The Newton Voice. The Newton community is also served by its high school publications, including Newton North High School's Newtonite and Newton South High School's Lion's Roar and Denebola. The Boston Globe occasionally covers Newton.

Television
Residents of Newton have access to a state-of-the-art television studio and community media center, NewTV, located at 23 Needham Street in Newton Highlands.  Newton is also home to NECN, a regional news network owned by NBC.

Radio
From 1968 to 2017, the studios and transmitter of WNTN AM-1550 were on Rumford Avenue in Auburndale.

Infrastructure

Hospital
Newton-Wellesley Hospital is located at 2014 Washington Street in Newton. U.S. News & World Report ranks the hospital 13th best in the Boston metro area.

Transportation
Newton's proximity to Boston, along with its good public schools and safe and quiet neighborhoods, make it a very desirable community for those who commute to Boston or work in Newton's businesses and industries.

Newton is well-served by three modes of mass transit run by the MBTA: light rail, commuter rail, and bus service. The Green Line D branch, (also known as the Riverside branch) is a light rail line running through the center of the city that makes very frequent trips to downtown Boston, ranging from 10 to 30 minutes away. The Green Line B branch ends across from Boston College on Commonwealth Avenue, virtually at the border of Boston's  Brighton neighborhood and the City of Newton (an area which encompasses an unincorporated suburban village referred  to as Chestnut Hill). The MBTA Worcester commuter rail, serving the northern villages of Newton that are proximate to Waltham, offers less frequent service to Boston. It runs from every half-an-hour during peak times to every couple of hours otherwise. The northern villages are also served by frequent express buses that go to downtown Boston via the Massachusetts Turnpike as well as Waltham.

Newton Centre, which is centered around the Newton Centre MBTA station, has been lauded as an example of transit-oriented development.

The Massachusetts Turnpike (Interstate 90), which basically follows the old Boston and Albany Railroad main line right-of-way, runs east and west through Newton, while Route 128 (Interstate 95) slices through the extreme western part of the city in the Lower Falls area. Route 30 (Commonwealth Avenue), Route 16 (Watertown Street west to West Newton, where it follows Washington Street west) and route 9 (Worcester Turnpike or Boylston Street) also run east and west through the city. Another major Boston (and Brookline) street, Beacon Street, runs west from the Boston city line to Washington Street west of the hospital, where it terminates at Washington Street.

There are no major north–south roads through Newton: every north–south street in Newton terminates within Newton at one end or the other. The only possible exception is Needham Street, which is north–south at the border between Newton and Needham, but it turns east and becomes Dedham Street, and when it reaches the Boston border, it goes south-east.

There are some north–south streets that are important to intra-Newton traveling. Centre Street runs south from the Watertown town line to Newton Highlands, where it becomes Winchester Street and terminates at Nahanton Street. Walnut Street runs south from Newtonville, where it starts at Crafts Street, down to Newton Highlands, where it ends at Dedham Street.

Public safety
The City of Newton Police Department has 139 sworn officers.  The Newton Fire Department is fully paid and operates six engine companies, three ladder companies, and one rescue company from six stations.

Notable people

Cemeteries
 East Parish Burying Ground, called Centre Street Cemetery by the city, dates from 1664
 West Parish Burying Ground (River Street Cemetery), West Newton, public
 St. Mary's Episcopal Church and Cemetery, 258 Concord Avenue, Newton Lower Falls, private
 South Burying Ground called Winchester Street Cemetery or Evergreen Cemetery by the city, public

In popular culture
 The Fig Newton cookie is named after the city. In 1991, Newton and Nabisco hosted a celebration of the 100th anniversary of the Fig Newton. A  Fig Newton was served, and singer and guitarist Juice Newton performed.
 Several scenes from the 1994 film The Next Karate Kid were filmed in Newton, including the house of the protagonist, who was played by Hilary Swank.
 William Landay's 2012 crime-drama novel Defending Jacob is set in Newton. The web television miniseries adaptation of the novel, starring Chris Evans as main character Andy Barber, was filmed in various locations of the city.
 A portion of crime drama film Patriots Day, based on the events of the Boston Marathon bombing, was filmed at Lasell College in Newton on May 18, 2016.
 Principal photography of the comedy film Sex Tape, starring Cameron Diaz and Jason Segel, took place in Newton on September 12, 2013.

Sister cities
Newton is currently twinned with:
 San Donato Val di Comino, Lazio, Italy
 San Juan del Sur, Nicaragua

See also

Crystal Lake and Pleasant Street Historic District
National Register of Historic Places listings in Newton, Massachusetts
Reginald A. Fessenden House, which is the only National Historic Landmark located in Newton
Silent Spring Institute
Green Line A branch (abandoned)
Geology of Massachusetts

References

Further reading
 Directory of the town of Newton: containing a general directory of the citizens, and a business directory. 1871 Google books

External links

 City of Newton official website
  Newton/Needham Chamber of Commerce

 
1630 establishments in Massachusetts
Charles River
Cities in Massachusetts
Cities in Middlesex County, Massachusetts
Jewish communities in the United States
Populated places established in 1630
Populated places on the Underground Railroad
Streetcar suburbs